Still Got Legs is the second and final studio album by British rock band Chameleon Circuit. The album was released through DFTBA Records on 12 July 2011. It charted at No. 23 on the Billboard Heatseekers album chart. The title is derived from the Eleventh Doctor's first words.

Promotion and release 

The album charted on the Billboard Heatseekers chart at no.23.

Track listing

Personnel
Alex Day - vocals, guitar, bass
Ed Blann - vocals, guitar
Charlie McDonnell - vocals, guitar, ukulele
Liam Dryden - vocals, keyboard, bass
Michael Aranda - production, vocals, guitar, percussion, bass, keyboard, mixing

Guest musicians
Bryarly Bishop - vocals on "Travelling Man", "Everything Is Ending", and "Silence and the End of All Things"
Ali Zogheib - harmonica and guitar on "Travelling Man"

Chart performance

References

External links 
 Still Got Legs on DFTBA Records

2011 albums
Doctor Who fandom
Chameleon Circuit (band) albums